Bakerganj is an Upazila of Barisal District in the Barisal Division, Bangladesh.

Geography
The upazila shares its boundaries with Nalchity Upazila and Barisal Sadar Upazila to the north, Mirzaganj Upazila, Dumki Upazila, and Bauphal Upazila to the south, Bauphal Upazila and Bhola Sadar Upazila to the east, and Nalchity Upazila, Betagi Upazila, and Rajapur Upazila to the west.

Demographics

According to the 2011 Bangladesh census, Bakerganj Upazila had 71,537 households and a population of 313,845, 6.2% of whom lived in urban areas. 10.0% of the population was under the age of 5. The literacy rate (age 7 and over) was 63.3%, compared to the national average of 51.8%.

Administration
Bakerganj Upazila is divided into Bakerganj Municipality and 14 union parishads: Bharpasha, Charadi, Char Amaddi, Darial, Dudhal, Durgapasha, Faridpur, Garuria, Kabai, Kalashkati, Nalua, Niamati, Padri Shibpur, and Rangasree. The union parishads are subdivided into 149 mauzas and 172 villages.

See also
Upazilas of Bangladesh
Districts of Bangladesh
Divisions of Bangladesh

References

Upazilas of Barisal District